Walter Morrish (October 19, 1890 – January 30, 1974) was a provincial politician from Alberta, Canada. He served as a member of the Legislative Assembly of Alberta from 1936 to 1940, sitting with the Liberal caucus in government.

References

Alberta Liberal Party MLAs
1974 deaths
1890 births
English emigrants to Canada